Heidi Eisenschmidt (later Zimmermann, born 14 November 1941) is a retired German swimmer. She competed in the 100 m butterfly at the 1960 Summer Olympics, but failed to reach the final. She won three national titles between 1958 and 1960 in the discontinued event of 4 × 100 m backstroke relay.

Her daughter Kathrin Zimmermann competed in swimming at the 1988 Summer Olympics.

References

1941 births
Living people
German female swimmers
Sportspeople from Gera
German female butterfly swimmers
Olympic swimmers of the United Team of Germany
Swimmers at the 1960 Summer Olympics